This is a list of mosques in Nepal.

{| class=wikitable style="text-align:center"
! align=left width=200px|Name
! align=center width=170px class=unsortable|Images
! align=left width=100px|Location
! align=left width=050px|Year/century
!align=left width=250px class=unsortable|Remarks
! align=left width=050px|References
|-
|Jama Masjid Rahmaniya
|  
|Bhairahawa 
| 1950
| One of the oldest mosques in Nepal
|  
|-
|Pancha Kashmiri Takiya Masjid
|  
|Kathmandu 
| 15th century 
| 
| 
|-
|Jama Mosque
| 
|Nepalgunj
| 
| 
|
|-
|Shahbaba Mosque
| 
|Nepalgunj
| 
| 
|
|-
|Namaj Mosque
| 
|Nepalgunj
| 
| 
|
|-
|Gausiya Jyaul Mosque
| 
|Nepalgunj
| 
| 
|
|-
|Ekminari Mosque
| 
|Nepalgunj
| 
| 
|
|-
|Fulbari Mosque
| 
|Nepalgunj
| 
| 
|
|-
|Shreepur Mosque
| 
|Birgunj
| 
| Al jamiyatul Gossia Jame Masjid
   Biratnagar
    
| Sarouchiya Masjid 
    Biratnagar
|-
|Parsa Jamah Masjid
|
|Parsa bazar Ward no. 1

See also
 Islam in Nepal
 Lists of mosques
 Nepalese Muslims

References

External links

 
Nepal
Mosques